Beblo may refer to:
Bębło
Fritz Beblo